Vladimir Nikolayevich Isakov (born 12 October 1979) is a former Russian professional footballer.

Club career
He made his professional debut in the Russian Third Division in 1997 for PFC CSKA-d Moscow.

Honours
 Russian Premier League runner-up: 1998.

References

1979 births
Russian footballers
Association football defenders
PFC CSKA Moscow players
Russian Premier League players
FC Chernomorets Novorossiysk players
FC Volgar Astrakhan players
FC Zvezda Irkutsk players
Living people
FC Novokuznetsk players